Splitting the Breeze is a 1927 American silent Western film directed by Robert De Lacey and starring Tom Tyler, Harry Woods and Peggy Montgomery.

Cast
 Tom Tyler as Death Valley Drake 
 Harry Woods as Dave Matlock 
 Barney Furey as Reverend Otis Briggs 
 Thomas G. Lingham as Tom Rand 
 Peggy Montgomery as Janet Rand 
 Buzz Barton as Red 
 Alfred Hewston as Hank Robbins
 Barbara Starr as Lois Cortez

References

Bibliography
 Munden, Kenneth White. The American Film Institute Catalog of Motion Pictures Produced in the United States, Part 1. University of California Press, 1997.

External links
 

1927 films
1927 Western (genre) films
Films directed by Robert De Lacey
American black-and-white films
Film Booking Offices of America films
Silent American Western (genre) films
1920s English-language films
1920s American films